DeMya Chakheia Walker (born November 28, 1977) is a professional basketball player from the United States.

High school
Walker was born and grew up in Mount Holly, New Jersey, where she attended Rancocas Valley Regional High School and she set school records for career rebounds (851), rebound average per game (14.2 rpg), most rebounds in a game (29), most points in a season (675), and most career points (1,546).

In her senior year, she was named to the 1995 All-American first team by Street & Smith's New Jersey High School "Female Athlete of the Year", and Parade Magazine All-America Second Team as a high school senior.

University of Virginia
Walker attended the University of Virginia and played on the women's basketball team (known as The Cavaliers) from 1995 to 1999.

By the time she graduated, she became Virginia's all-time leader in field goal percentage, as well as 330 career blocked shots which at the time was ranked 12th in the NCAA record books. She averaged 13.0 points per game and 6.9 rebounds per game during her career.

Her 1,583 points ranks her ninth in school history.

She was named the "Cavalier of the Year", and was an Honorable Mention All-America selection in her senior year (1998-99 season) after leading the team in scoring, rebounding, field goal percentage and blocked shots.

She is also a member of the Zeta Phi Beta Sorority.

USA Basketball
Walker was selected to play with the USA team at the 1999 Pan American Games. The team finished with a record of 4–3, but won the bronze medal with an 85–59 victory over Brazil. Walker averaged 1.6 points per game.

WNBA career
Despite her impressive career in college, Walker was not selected by any of the WNBA teams during the 1999 WNBA Draft, mainly due to the influx of former players from the just-disbanded American Basketball League (ABL), a rival professional women's league. Several of the ABL's star players were selected in that year's draft.

However, prior to the start of the 1999 WNBA season, Walker was assigned to the Minnesota Lynx for its pre-season training camp, but was cut from the team final roster shortly afterwards. Walker spent that summer playing overseas on a professional women's league team in Italy.

In 2000, she signed a free agent contract with the Portland Fire, and played with them for three seasons until the team was disbanded due to financial difficulties.

On April 24, 2003, the WNBA held a Dispersal draft, where various former players from the newly-defunct Portland Fire and Miami Sol teams were chosen by the existing WNBA teams. Walker was selected by the Sacramento Monarchs as the fifth overall pick in the 2003 WNBA Dispersal Draft.

Walker played the 2003–08 seasons with the Monarchs, and even helped the team win the 2005 WNBA Finals by defeating the Connecticut Sun, three games to one.

When the Monarchs folded prior to the 2010 WNBA season, Walker was selected by the Connecticut Sun in a dispersal draft.

Personal

Two months after the Monarchs won the title she announced her pregnancy.
In April 2006, after going through an intense four days of labor, Walker gave a Caesarean section birth to her first child, a daughter named Zachara.  She went on maternity leave and missed the first 11 games of the 2006 WNBA season, before returning to the Monarchs' player roster.
Earned her degree from Virginia in Government.
After playing days are over wants to be an attorney in mergers & acquisitions.

References

External links
WNBA Player Profile
Walker's blog throughout her pregnancy period
May 21, 2006 Sacramento Bee column on Walker's return from maternity leave
Walker returns to Sacramento

1977 births
Living people
American women's basketball players
Basketball players at the 1999 Pan American Games
Basketball players from New Jersey
Connecticut Sun players
New York Liberty players
Parade High School All-Americans (girls' basketball)
People from Mount Holly, New Jersey
Portland Fire players
Power forwards (basketball)
Rancocas Valley Regional High School alumni
Sacramento Monarchs players
Sportspeople from Burlington County, New Jersey
Virginia Cavaliers women's basketball players
Washington Mystics players
Women's National Basketball Association All-Stars
Pan American Games bronze medalists for the United States
Pan American Games medalists in basketball
Undrafted Women's National Basketball Association players
Liaoning Flying Eagles players
American expatriate basketball people in China
Beijing Great Wall players
Medalists at the 1999 Pan American Games
United States women's national basketball team players